Same-sex marriage has been legal in the State of Mexico since 2 November 2022. On 11 October 2022, the Congress of the State of Mexico voted 50–16 with seven abstentions to pass a bill legalizing same-sex marriage. It was published on 1 November 2022, and took effect the next day. The State of Mexico was the third-to-last state in Mexico to provide for same-sex marriage.

Legal history

Background
On 15 February 2013, four same-sex couples applied to marry at the civil registry office in Toluca. Civil registry officials refused to issue them marriage licenses, and consequently the couples filed an amparo in court. On 24 June 2013, a federal judge granted the amparo, ruling that the articles of the Civil Code that prohibited same-sex couples from marrying were discriminatory. The state filed an appeal of the decision. An appellate court declared itself unable to resolve the dispute in January 2014, whereupon the case was elevated to the Supreme Court of Justice of the Nation. Oral arguments were set for 6 November 2014; however, the judges postponed the hearing for an additional ten days. On 25 February 2015, the Supreme Court granted the amparo, and declared the Civil Code unconstitutional and discriminatory. A lesbian couple, one of the four couples to have applied to marry back in February 2013, became the first same-sex couple to marry in the state on 18 April 2015.

The Mexican Supreme Court ruled on 12 June 2015 that state bans on same-sex marriage are unconstitutional nationwide. The court's ruling is considered a "jurisprudential thesis" and did not invalidate state laws, meaning that same-sex couples denied the right to marry would still have to seek individual amparos in court. The ruling standardized the procedures for judges and courts throughout Mexico to approve all applications for same-sex marriages and made the approval mandatory. Specifically, the court ruled that same-sex marriage bans violate Articles 1 and 4 of the Constitution of Mexico. Article 1 of the Constitution states that "any form of discrimination, based on ethnic or national origin, gender, age, disabilities, social status, medical conditions, religion, opinions, sexual orientation, marital status, or any other form, which violates the human dignity or seeks to annul or diminish the rights and freedoms of the people, is prohibited.", and Article 4 relates to matrimonial equality, stating that "man and woman are equal under the law. The law shall protect the organization and development of the family." Two more amparos for same-sex marriage rights were granted in Toluca in late October 2017. One of the two couples married in December 2017, making them the first male couple to marry in the state. By December 2017, six same-sex couples had been granted amparos to marry in the state.

Legislative action
In 2008, an initiative for the legalization of civil unions was introduced to the Congress of the State of Mexico, but stalled and was never voted on. In 2010, an initiative to legalize same-sex marriage was introduced to Congress, but similarly to the civil union proposal it stalled. After 3 years of legislative inaction, Deputy Octavio Martínez from the Party of the Democratic Revolution (PRD) introduced a same-sex marriage bill to Congress in 2013. In January 2014, Martínez said that the PRD would continue to press for the legalization of same-sex marriage and insisted that the bill be discussed by Congress. In January 2015, Israfil Filós Real, the president of the Vulnerable Groups Civil Association, called on lawmakers to pass the same-sex marriage bill. Consequently, Governor Eruviel Ávila Villegas submitted a new marriage bill, while the PRD submitted a proposal to legalize adoption by same-sex couples on 5 March 2015. A Congress session for the possible approval of Ávila Villegas' same-sex marriage bill was scheduled for 31 May 2016. However, two political parties, the National Action Party (PAN) and the New Alliance Party, requested more time to study the proposal. José Manzur Quiroga, the Secretary General of Government, announced that the bill may be voted on during Congress' next extraordinary session, though no vote took place for the following six years. The July 2018 elections resulted in the National Regeneration Movement (MORENA), a party that supports same-sex marriage, winning the majority of legislative seats in Congress. Nevertheless, progress on the legalization of same-sex marriage continued to stall for the following four years.

Passage of legislation in 2022
Another same-sex marriage bill was introduced to Congress in 2022 by Deputy Daniel Sibaja González (MORENA). A vote in a Congress committee was scheduled for the second week of September 2022. The vote was delayed until 23 September, however, and a plenary vote was scheduled for October. On 23 September, the committee vote was postponed to the following week. The committee approved the bill on 27 September. A final, plenary vote was scheduled for Tuesday, 11 October 2022. The bill passed Congress on 11 October by 50 votes to 16. It was published in the official state journal on 1 November, following Governor Alfredo del Mazo Maza's signature, and took effect the next day. The first same-sex marriage performed under the new law occurred on 2 November in Coacalco de Berriozábal between Leticia Chávez Rivera and María del Rosario Pérez Vilchis.

Article 4bis of the Civil Code was amended to read:
 in Spanish: 
 (Marriage is a public and social institution, in which two people freely and voluntarily decide to share a community of life seeking personal and conjugal fulfillment, under the formalities and solemnities established by the present Code.)

Public opinion
According to a 2018 survey by the National Institute of Statistics and Geography, 38% of the State of Mexico public opposed same-sex marriage.

See also
 Same-sex marriage in Mexico
 LGBT rights in Mexico

Notes

References

External links
 Text of the State of Mexico's same-sex marriage law (in Spanish)

Mexico
State of Mexico
2022 in LGBT history